This article shows All past squads from the Italian professional volleyball team Volleyball Casalmaggiore from the Serie A League.

All Past Rosters

2016–17

2015–16

2014–15

2013–14

References

External links

Official website 

Italian women's volleyball club squads